The 1972 Amstel Gold Race was the seventh edition of the annual road bicycle race "Amstel Gold Race", held on Sunday March 26, 1972, in the Dutch province of Limburg. The race stretched 237 kilometres, with the start in Heerlen and the finish in Meerssen. There were a total number of 97 competitors, and 29 cyclists finished the race.

Result

External links
Results

Amstel Gold Race
1972 in road cycling
1972 in Dutch sport